The 2018 Alabama Crimson Tide football team represented the University of Alabama in the 2018 NCAA Division I FBS football season. This season marked the Crimson Tide's 124th overall season, 85th as a member of the Southeastern Conference (SEC), and 27th within the SEC Western Division. They played their home games at Bryant–Denny Stadium in Tuscaloosa, Alabama and were led by twelfth-year head coach Nick Saban.

Alabama, coming off a national championship winning season in 2017, began the season ranked first in the AP Poll for the third consecutive year and fifth time under Nick Saban. The Tide opened the year with a dominant victory over Louisville in the Camping World Kickoff played in Orlando, Florida. Alabama won their remaining regular season games to achieve their second undefeated regular season in three years. As champions of the SEC's Western Division, they played in the 2018 SEC Championship Game, defeating Eastern Division champion Georgia, in a rematch of the 2017 national title game, 35–28, to win the school's 27th SEC title. In the final College Football Playoff rankings of the year, Alabama was ranked first, which earned them their fifth consecutive playoff berth and a spot in the 2018 Orange Bowl against fourth-ranked Oklahoma. Alabama won that game 45–34 to advance to the 2019 College Football Playoff National Championship against Clemson, their fourth consecutive playoff match-up against Clemson and the third to be in a national title game. The Crimson Tide lost in a blowout, 16–44, representing the Tide's worst loss in the Saban era.

The Crimson Tide were led on offense by sophomore quarterback Tua Tagovailoa, who won the starting job over two-year starter Jalen Hurts. Tagovailoa set the NCAA FBS record for passing efficiency rating (199.4), was a consensus first-team All-American, and finished second in voting for the Heisman Trophy behind Oklahoma's Kyler Murray. Hurts, despite losing the starting role, received praise for sticking with the team and helping to mount a comeback in the SEC Championship Game when Tagovailoa went down with an ankle injury. Also receiving consensus first-team All-America honors on offense were wide receiver Jerry Jeudy, winner of the Biletnikoff Award, and offensive tackle Jonah Williams. On defense, Alabama featured two consensus All-Americans, defensive lineman Quinnen Williams and defensive back Deionte Thompson.

Previous season

Alabama came into the season ranked No. 1 in both preseason polls and finished the 2017 regular season with a record of eleven wins and one loss (11–1 overall, 7–1 in the SEC), the sole loss being to Auburn in the Iron Bowl. The Crimson Tide were ranked number 4 the season prior to their national championship appearance against Georgia. The Crimson Tide opened the season with eleven consecutive victories that included one over Florida State at a neutral site, against Vanderbilt, Ole Miss and Tennessee in a game that saw many team records broken and a victory over LSU at Bryant–Denny Stadium. In their twelfth game, Alabama was upset by Auburn, keeping them out of the SEC Championship Game. During the final College Football Playoff (CFP) Selection poll, Alabama was included at number 4 and played number 1 Clemson in a rubber match of the past two playoffs in the semi-final game played at the Sugar Bowl winning 24–6. Alabama was matched in the 2018 College Football Playoff National Championship game against number 3 Georgia who beat Oklahoma in the Rose Bowl, 54–48. Alabama won in overtime, 26–23, to secure the CFP National Championship. Alabama was also selected as champions by the Associated Press (AP)  for a record 11th time in program history and recognized by the National Football Foundation (NFF) as the McArthur Bowl recipient, giving Alabama their 17th claimed national title. The Crimson Tide finished the 2017 season with a record of 13–1.

Offseason

Offseason departures

Recruiting

The 2018 football recruiting cycle was the first in which the NCAA authorized two signing periods for high school seniors in that sport. In addition to the traditional spring period starting with National Signing Day on February 7, 2018, a new early signing period was introduced, with the first such period falling from December 20–22, 2017.

 

 
  
 
 

 
 

 
 
 
 

Source:

Incoming transfers
Alabama added one transfer to the 2018 roster.

Returning starters

Offense

Defense

Special teams

|}

Position key
{| class="wikitable"
|-
|Back
|B
|rowSpan="6" style="background-color:lightgrey;"|
|Center
|C
|rowSpan="6" style="background-color:lightgrey;"|
|Cornerback
|CB
|rowSpan="6" style="background-color:lightgrey;"|
|Defensive back
|DB
|-
|Defensive end
|DE
|Defensive lineman
|DL
|Defensive tackle
|DT
|End
|E
|-
|Fullback
|FB
|Guard
|G
|Halfback
|HB
|Kicker
|K
|-
|Kickoff returner
|KR
|Offensive tackle
|OT
|Offensive lineman
|OL
|Linebacker
|LB
|-
|Long snapper
|LS
|Punter
|P
|Punt returner
|PR
|Quarterback
|QB
|-
|Running back
|RB
|Safety
|S
|Tight end
|TE
|Wide receiver
|WR

Preseason

Award watchlists
Listed in the order that they were released

SEC media poll
The SEC media poll was released on July 20, 2018, with the Crimson Tide predicted to win the West Division and the SEC overall.

Preseason All-SEC teams
The Crimson Tide had 13 players at 14 positions selected to the preseason all-SEC teams.

Offense

1st team

Damien Harris – RB

Jonah Williams – OL

Ross Pierschbacher – C

2nd team

Lester Cotton – OL

3rd team

Jerry Jeudy – WR

Matt Womack – OL

Defense

1st team

Raekwon Davis – DL

Anfernee Jennings – LB

Mack Wilson – LB

Deionte Thompson – DB

2nd team

Isaiah Buggs – DL

3rd team

Dylan Moses – LB

Specialists

2nd team

Trevon Diggs – all purpose player

3rd team

Trevon Diggs – RET

Spring game
The 2018 Crimson Tide had spring practice from April 2018. The 2018 Alabama football spring game, "A-Day" took place in Tuscaloosa, AL on April 21, at 1 p.m. CST.

Schedule

Alabama announced its 2018 football schedule on September 19, 2017. The 2018 Crimson Tide schedule consists of 7 home and 4 away games for the regular season. Alabama will host four SEC conference opponents Texas A&M, Missouri, Mississippi State (rivalry) and arch-rival Auburn for the 125th annual Iron Bowl to close out the regular season and will travel for four SEC opponents to Ole Miss (rivalry), Arkansas, Tennessee (Third Saturday of October) and close out on the road at LSU (rivalry). Alabama is not scheduled to play SEC East opponents Florida, Georgia, Kentucky, South Carolina and Vanderbilt in the 2018 regular season. The Crimson Tide's bye week comes during week 9 on October 27.

Alabama's out of conference opponents represent the ACC, Southern and Sun Belt. The Crimson Tide will host three non–conference games which are against Arkansas State and Louisiana of the Sun Belt and The Citadel of the SoCon and travel to Orlando, FL for Camping World Kickoff host Louisville from the ACC.

Schedule Source:

Coaching staff

Graduate Assistant
Mike Miller
 Nick Perry
Kyle Pope
Analysts
 Andy Kwon
Isaac Shewmaker
Alex Mortensen
Javier Arenas
Dean Altobelli
Gordon Steele
Butch Jones
Brendan Farrell
Jake Peetz
August Mangin
Mike Miller
Lou Spanos
Jake Long
Rob Ezell

Roster

Depth chart

Game summaries

vs. Louisville 

Sources:

Statistics

vs. Arkansas State 

Sources:

Statistics

at Ole Miss 

Sources:
 

Statistics

vs. Texas A&M 

Sources:

Statistics

vs. Louisiana 

Sources:

Statistics

at Arkansas 

Sources:

Statistics

vs. Missouri 

Sources:

Statistics

at Tennessee 

Sources:

Statistics

at LSU 

Sources:

Statistics

vs. Mississippi State 

Sources:

Statistics

vs. The Citadel 

Sources:

Statistics

vs. Auburn 

Sources:

Statistics

vs. Georgia (SEC Championship Game)

Sources:

Statistics

vs. Oklahoma (Orange Bowl–CFP Semifinal)

Sources:

Statistics

vs. Clemson (National Championship) 

Sources:

Statistics

Rankings

In-season polls

Statistics

Team

Offense

Defense
Key: POS: Position, SOLO: Solo Tackles, AST: Assisted Tackles, TOT: Total Tackles, TFL: Tackles-for-loss, SACK: Quarterback Sacks, INT: Interceptions, PD: Passes Defended, FF: Forced Fumbles, FR: Fumbles Recovered, BLK: Kicks or Punts Blocked, SAF: Safeties

Scores by quarter (non-conference opponents)

Scores by quarter (SEC opponents)

Scores by quarter (All opponents)

Awards and honors

Weekly awards
 Quinnen Williams
 (2) SEC Defensive Lineman Player of the Weeks (Week 1 vs Louisville), (Week 11 vs Mississippi State)
 SEC Defensive Player of the Week (Week 10 vs LSU)
 Jaylen Waddle
 SEC Freshman Player of the Week (Week 1 vs Louisville)
 Christian Miller
 SEC Defensive Player of the Week (Week 3 vs Ole Miss)
 Tua Tagovailoa (4)
 SEC Offensive Player of the Week (Week 4 vs Texas A&M), (Week 8 vs Tennessee), (Week 13 vs Auburn)
 Ross Pierschbacher
 SEC Offensive Lineman Player of the Week (Week 6 vs Arkansas)
 Jedrick Wills
 SEC Offensive Lineman Player of the Week (Week 7 vs Missouri)
 Jonah Williams
 SEC Offensive Lineman Player of the Week (Week 10 vs LSU)
 Isaiah Buggs
 SEC Defensive Lineman Player of the Week (Week 4 vs Texas A&M)

Individual Awards
 Jonah Williams – Jacobs Blocking Trophy
 Jaylen Waddle – SEC Freshman Player of the Year
 Tua Tagovailoa – SEC Offensive Player of the Year, SN Player of the Year, Walter Camp Award, Maxwell Award, Polynesian College Football Player of the Year
 Hale Hentges – SEC Scholar Athlete Player of the Year
 Quinnen Williams – Bill Willis Award, Outland Trophy
 Jerry Jeudy – Fred Biletnikoff Award
 Mike Locksley, OC – Broyles Award
 Nick Saban, HC – Walter Camp Coach of the Year

All-Americans
 Jerry Jeudy – AP First Team, Walter Camp First Team, Sporting News First Team, AFCA First Team, ESPN All-America
 Jonah Williams – AP First Team, Walter Camp First Team, Sporting News First Team, FWAA First Team, AFCA First Team, ESPN All-America
 Quinnen Williams – AP First Team, Walter Camp First Team, Sporting News First Team, FWAA First Team, AFCA First Team, ESPN All-America
 Deionte Thompson – AP Second Team, Sporting News First Team, AFCA First Team, ESPN All-America
 Tua Tagovailoa – AP Second Team, Walter Camp First Team, Sporting News First Team, FWAA Second Team, AFCA First Team 
 Ross Pierschbacher – AP Second Team, Sporting News First Team
 Keaton anderson – COSIDA Academic All-America Second Team
 Dylan Moses – Walter Camp Second Team
 Isaiah Buggs – AFCA Second Team
 Irv Smith Jr. – AFCA Second Team
 Mack Wilson – AFCA Second Team
 Patrick Surtain II – AP Freshman All-America, USA Today Freshman All-America 
 Jaylen Waddle – AP Freshman All-America, USA Today Freshman All-America

All-SEC Teams
1st Team

 Tua Tagovailoa, Quarterback (AP-1, Coaches-1)
 Jerry Jeudy, Wide Receiver (AP-1, Coaches-1)
 Ross Pierschbacher, Center (AP-1, Coaches-2)
 Jonah Williams, Offensive Tackle (AP-1, Coaches-1)
 Quinnen Williams, Defensive Tackle  (AP-1, Coaches-1)
 Deionte Thompson, Safety (Coaches-1)

2nd Team
 Damien Harris, Running Back (Coaches-2)
 Alex Leatherwood, Offensive Tackle (Coaches-2)
 Irv Smith Jr., Tight End (AP-2)
 Isaiah Buggs, Defensive End (AP-2, Coaches-2)
 Raekwon Davis, Defensive End (Media-2)
 Dylan Moses, Linebacker (Coaches-2)
 Mack Wilson, Linebacker (Coaches-2)
 Deionte Thompson, Safety  (AP-2)

Postseason

Reese's Senior Bowl
 Christian Miller, Linebacker
 Isaiah Buggs, Defensive lineman

All Star Game

Players drafted into the NFL

Media Affiliates

Radio

TV
CBS Family – CBS 42 (CBS), CBS Sports Network 
ESPN/ABC Family – ABC 33/40 (ABC), ABC, ESPN, ESPN2, ESPNU, ESPN+, SEC Network)

Notes

References

Alabama
Alabama Crimson Tide football seasons
Orange Bowl champion seasons
Southeastern Conference football champion seasons
Alabama Crimson Tide football